Anthony Pellegrino (born September 18, 1943) is an American politician in the state of New Hampshire. He is a member of the New Hampshire House of Representatives, sitting as a Republican from the Hillsborough 21 district, having been first elected in 2008.

References

Living people
1943 births
Members of the New Hampshire House of Representatives